was a Japanese linguist. He founded the influential "Yamada grammar" (Also known as "Yamada's grammar", and was the first to use the word "chinjutsu" as a linguistic term.

Yamada's Grammar
Yamada Yoshio's grammar was first published in 1912 and underwent several changes and reprints.

Yamada's grammar greatly influenced 20th century scholarship in Japan.

References

1873 births
1958 deaths
Linguists from Japan
People from Toyama (city)